Reuben Gronau (born 1937) is an Israeli economist, notable for his contributions to labour economics and economic sociology, in particular the Gronau model of time allocation and home production.

Gronau received his Ph.D. in 1967 from Columbia University, under supervision of Jacob Mincer and Gary Becker, with a thesis on transport economics.

References

External links 
 Profile at Bank of Israel

1937 births
Columbia University alumni
Hebrew University of Jerusalem alumni
Israeli economists
Labor economists
Living people
Fellows of the Econometric Society

American economists